Kecskemét Air Base  is a military air base located near Kecskemét, a city in Bács-Kiskun county, Hungary. The base is the venue for the Kecskemét Air Show.

Facilities

References

External links

 
 

Military airbases of Hungary
Buildings and structures in Bács-Kiskun County